Allow Me to Reintroduce Myself may refer to:

"Allow Me to Reintroduce Myself" (Scandal), TV episode
Allow Me to Reintroduce Myself (EP), by Zara Larsson
Allow Me to Re-Introduce Myself, mixtape by Kardinal Offishall and Nottz

See also
"Let Me Reintroduce Myself", 2020 single by Gwen Stefani
"Allow me to reintroduce myself", the opening line of Jay-Z's 2003 song "Public Service Announcement"